Rajkumar Hirani (born 20 November 1962), also called Raju Hirani, is an Indian filmmaker, director, producer and editor known for his works in Hindi films. He is the recipient of several accolades, including three National Film Awards and eleven Filmfare Awards. Hirani is referred as one of the most successful filmmakers of Indian cinema. His movies are often lighthearted but revolve around significant societal issues with humour and emotional intelligence.

Starting his career as a film editor after passing out from FTII in editing, bad experience forced him to shift in ad films, where he made several successful ads. He edited his first film as a professional editor to Vidhu Vinod Chopra's Mission Kashmir (2000). Although Hirani wanted to make films, he took a one year break and came back with the script of Munna Bhai MBBS to Chopra to help him for financing it, and Chopra produced it himself. The film released in 2003 and became widespread critical and commercial success. It won the National Film Award for Best Popular Film Providing Wholesome Entertainment and the Filmfare Critics Award for Best Film, and earned Hirani his first Filmfare Award for Best Screenplay and a nomination for the Best Director. 

After the success of MBBS, the sequel Lage Raho Munna Bhai (2006) which was second highest grosser of the year and coming-of-age drama 3 Idiots (2009), both of them won National Film Award for Best Popular Film Providing Wholesome Entertainment and nominated in Filmfare Award for Best Film, Best Screenplay and Best Director, won all for 3 Idiots, which was also a huge commercial success, became the highest grossing Indian film of its time. His next the science fiction religious satire PK (2014) with Aamir Khan as an alien again, the highest grossing Indian film of its time and a biography drama  Sanju (2018) based on Sanjay Dutt released with critical and commercial success. Both films were nominated for Best Film,  Best Director at Filmfare Awards, won Best Screenplay for PK. Domestically both films are currently the third and fourth highest grossing Bollywood film behind Pathaan and Dangal. Hirani is the founder of the production house Rajkumar Hirani Films.

Early life and education 
Hirani was born on 20 November 1962 in Nagpur to a Sindhi family. His ancestors originally belong to Mehrabpur, a city now in the Naushahro Firoz District, Sindh, of Pakistan. His father Suresh Hirani ran a typing institute in Nagpur. Hirani studied at St. Francis De'Sales High School, Nagpur, Maharashtra. He did his graduation in commerce. His parents wanted him to be an engineer, but he was more keen on theatre and film.

In his college days he was involved with Hindi theatre. He had many friends in Nagpur's medical college and hence, spent much time in theater at the college. Suresh had his son's photographs taken and sent him to an acting school in Mumbai. However, Hirani could not fit in and returned to Nagpur after three days. His father then asked him to apply to the Film and Television Institute of India in Pune, but the acting course had shut down and his chances of admission to the directorial course looked slim as there were far too many applicants. Hirani opted for the film editing course, and earned a scholarship.

Career

Early work (1994–99, 2000) 
Hirani tried his luck as a film editor for many years. Bad experiences forced him to shift to television advertising, and he gradually established himself as a director and producer of advertising films. He was also seen in a Fevicol ad where some men and elephants were trying to pull and break a Fevicol plank, saying "Jor laga ke Haisha". He was also seen in the Kinetic Luna ad campaign created by Ogilvy & Mather.

He was doing fairly well in the advertisement industry, but he wanted to make movies, so he took a break from advertisement and started working with Vidhu Vinod Chopra. He worked on promos and trailers for 1942: A Love Story (1994). He edited promotions for Kareeb (1998). He got his first opportunity as a film editor with Mission Kashmir (2000).

Directorial debut and initial success (2003–09) 

In 2003, Hirani made his directorial debut with the comedy film Munna Bhai M.B.B.S. starring Sanjay Dutt, Arshad Warsi, Boman Irani, Gracy Singh, Jimmy Sheirgill, and Sunil Dutt. It was about the titular protagonist (played by Sanjay Dutt), a goon going to a medical school who is helped by his sidekick (Circuit, played by Warsi). The film received a positive response from critics. Munna Bhai M.B.B.S. won the National Film Award for Best Popular Film Providing Wholesome Entertainment and the Filmfare Critics Award for Best Film, and earned Hirani his first Filmfare Award for Best Screenplay and a nomination for the Filmfare Award for Best Director. The film was the first film of the franchise Munna Bhai.

In 2006, Hirani directed the second installment of the Munna Bhai franchise, titled Lage Raho Munna Bhai, which retained some of the original cast, including Sanjay Dutt, Warsi, and Boman Irani, and added Vidya Balan as the female lead replacing Gracy Singh. The feature proved to be Hirani's highest-grossing release to that point, earning over  worldwide, thus attaining a blockbuster status and becoming the third highest-grossing film of that year. Just like the previous film, it won the National Film Award for Best Popular Film, and earned Hirani a second Critics Award for Best Film award, a first Best Story award, a first Best Dialogue award, and a second Best Director nomination at Filmfare.

Widespread success (2009–present) 

Hirani's next directorial venture was the coming-of-age comedy-drama 3 Idiots (2009), which starred Aamir Khan, Kareena Kapoor Khan, R. Madhavan, Sharman Joshi, and Boman Irani. It follows the friendship of three engineering students, and was a satire about social pressures under an Indian education system. 3 Idiots received positive reviews from critics, and proved to be the highest-grossing Indian film up until then, earning  in global ticket sales. Hirani won his third National Film Award for Best Popular Film Award, first Filmfare Best Film and Best Director Award, and second Filmfare Best Screenplay and Best Story Award, for his direction. The film established Hirani as one of Hindi cinema's most prominent filmmakers.

Hirani directed PK, which was released on 19 December 2014. Upon release, it received positive reviews, with praise directed towards Aamir Khan's performance and the film's humour, though certain criticism was received for "hurting religious sentiments". The film received 8 nominations at the 60th Filmfare Awards, winning two. Additionally, it won five Producers Guild Film Awards, and two Screen Awards. PK garnered the Telstra People's Choice Award at the Indian Film Festival of Melbourne. Produced on a budget of 850 million (approx. $12 million), PK was the first Indian film to gross more than 7 billion and US$100 million worldwide. At the time, it emerged as the highest-grossing Indian film of all time and ranks as the 70th highest-grossing film of 2014 worldwide. The film's final worldwide gross was 854crore (US$140million). It currently stands as the 5th highest grossing Indian film worldwide and 7th highest-grossing film in India.

He also directed Sanju (2018). The film follows the life of actor Sanjay Dutt (one of Hirani's closest collaborators), his addiction with drugs, arrest for alleged association with the 1993 Bombay bombings, relationship with his father, comeback in the industry, the eventual drop of charges from bombay blasts, and release after completing his jail term. Upon release, it generally received positive reviews from critics and was praised for Ranbir Kapoor's performance; some criticised its image-cleansing of its protagonist. Sanju earned seven nominations at the 64th Filmfare Awards, including Best Film and Best Director for Hirani. It won two; Best Actor for Kapoor (who played Dutt) and Best Supporting Actor for Kaushal.

Hirani is next directing Dunki, a comedy-drama film on immigration produced by himself and Red Chillies Entertainment (whom he is working with for the first time) and written by him and Joshi. It stars Shah Rukh Khan, Taapsee Pannu, Vicky Kaushal, Boman Irani, Sunil Grover, Deepak Dobriyal and Divya Dutta and will be released theatrically on 22 December 2023, coinciding with Christmas.

Style, themes and influence  

Hirani's films are often based on themes which explore particularly different critical social issue like middle class aspirations, reforming, standing up for themselves, fighting for the right thing, relationships among family but with healthy humour and full of emotional quotient. Hirani is editor of all of his films, he himself admitted he enjoys editing film more than anything else. Rajeev Masand said "Like those good old-fashioned Hrishikesh Mukherjee films, Hirani's film reinforced  importance of human goodness and basic niceties. Hirani has been cited one of his most favourite film, Mukherjee's Anand (1971). Munna Bhai MBBS deals with corruption of hospital and cruelty of doctors, Lage Raho Munna Bhai deals with Gandhi's thinking and reforming people with soft hearted, 3 Idiots with education system, pressure on students for marks and passion of individuals, PK with religion and superstition and Sanju on relationships and media outrage. Film critic Komal Nahta called Rajkumar Hirani a magician more than a director during reviewing Sanju. He added," He narrates the complex story of a misdirected, ignorant and foolish young man with such sensitivity that the human drama becomes quite a masterpiece of a film."

All of Hirani's films are produced by Vinod Chopra Films. He had one of Chopra's films Mission Kashmir professionally. Hirani has worked consistently with writer Abhijat Joshi since Lage Raho Munna Bhai. Hirani has often cast the same actors in his projects, particularly Sanjay Dutt, who has collaborated with Hirani on three feature films and one film which itself is based on Dutt. Aamir Khan has done two path breaking films with Hirani. Boman Irani has been there in all of Hirani's films in pivotal supporting roles.

Hirani is considered a pioneer of his own cinema style. He has garnered the appraisal by several industry's successful makers and his contemporaries like Karan Johar who said,
 I've been pitted against everyone and I feel envious, not jealous. I am envious of Rajkumar Hirani. I've never managed to do what he does. His movies have genius ideas. I don't have the ability perhaps. I would love to make those kinds of movies. He has strong screenplays. I hope I get such screenplays. 

Director Anurag Kashyap called him bravest filmmakers, he added: Generally, we filmmakers get into our subject to prove its poignancy so much that we end up making it less effective for audience. But Raju didn't do that.

SS Rajamouli said during the promotion of Baahubali: The Beginning that he is a huge fan of Hirani's films and that he cannot make one scene the way Hirani does.

Screenwriter Javed Akhtar praised Hirani's work saying,  "I am a huge admirer of Rajkumar Hirani. He does really good work and now again, he has done an amazing job. I always say one thing about him, that to make such kind of films, you not only have to be a really good director or writer, you have to be really a good human being as well.

Personal life 
Hirani married Manjeet Hirani, a pilot in Air India, in 1994. They have a son, Vir Hirani, who is also pursuing filmmaking.

He was further accused of being against godman and religion, he then added: I am being asked about if I am against religious gurus or godmen, why have I expressed gratitude to Sri Sri Ravi Shankar in the film's opening credits?. My answer is that I am not against religious gurus or godmen, I am only against the fake ones.

Filmography

Awards and nominations

Commercial performance 
The budgets and box-office figures are all estimates collated from various sources with reputed film portals. All values in Indian Rupees (₹) are converted to US Dollars ($) based on the average yearly exchange rate data from World Bank.

References

External links 

 
 

Living people
1962 births
Screen Awards winners
International Indian Film Academy Awards winners
Film directors from Maharashtra
Hindi-language film directors
Artists from Nagpur
Sindhi people
Film and Television Institute of India alumni
Telstra People's Choice Award winners
Indian male screenwriters
Hindi film editors
Filmfare Awards winners
21st-century Indian film directors
Film editors from Maharashtra
Best Original Screenplay National Film Award winners
Directors who won the Best Popular Film Providing Wholesome Entertainment National Film Award